Toshiya Nakashima (中島 俊哉, born June 10, 1980 in Chikugo, Fukuoka) is a Japanese professional baseball outfielder for the Tohoku Rakuten Golden Eagles in Japan's Nippon Professional Baseball.

External links

NPB.com

1980 births
Japanese baseball players
Living people
Nippon Professional Baseball outfielders
Orix BlueWave players
Baseball people from Fukuoka Prefecture
People from Chikugo, Fukuoka
Tohoku Rakuten Golden Eagles players